Cyanidiophytina is a subdivision of red algae.

In older texts it was described as an order "Cyanidiales". It was granted division status in the Saunders and Hommersand 2004 classification (as "Cyanidophyta"), but was only elevated to subdivision Cyanidiophytina in the Yoon et al. classification of 2006.

References

Further reading
 Ruggiero, M. A.; Gordon, D. P.; Orrell, T. M.; Bailly, N.; Bourgoin, T.; Brusca, R. C.; Cavalier-Smith, T.; Guiry, M. D.; Kirk, P. M. (2015). Correction: A Higher Level Classification of All Living Organisms. PLoS ONE. 10(4): e0119248. 

Red algae taxa